João Pedro Teixeira de Jesus Pio (born ) is a Brazilian futsal player who plays as a defender for Minas and the Brazilian national futsal team.

References

External links
Liga Nacional de Futsal profile
The Final Ball profile

1996 births
Living people
Brazilian men's futsal players
Minas Tênis Clube players
Sportspeople from Belo Horizonte
21st-century Brazilian people